Lipa is a village in the Municipality of Beltinci in the Prekmurje region of northeastern Slovenia.

References

External links
Lipa on Geopedia

Populated places in the Municipality of Beltinci

hr:Lipovci